Kuustonen is a Finnish surname. Notable people with the surname include:

Iina Kuustonen (born 1984), Finnish actress
Mikko Kuustonen (born 1960), Finnish singer-songwriter and television personality

Finnish-language surnames